Chalk River (2016 population: 1029) is a small rural village, part of the Laurentian Hills municipality in Renfrew County, Ontario, Canada. Chalk River was a separate municipality until January 1, 2000, when the United Townships of Rolph, Buchanan, Wylie and McKay and the Village of Chalk River were merged.

Chalk River's area is environmentally pristine with extensive forests, hills and numerous small lakes, all of which support a variety of wildlife typical to the southern edge of the Canadian Shield.

St. Anthony's Elementary School is the only educational institution in the community, instructing grades Junior Kindergarten to Grade 8. It provides Catholic education to the children in the neighbourhood, with a church next door. Students in higher grades are bussed to nearby Deep River.

The town consists mainly of detached houses with some townhouses and an apartment building. Local services include a convenience store and a gas station.  The only traditional truck stop-style restaurant, the Treetop, was lost in February 2019 to a roof collapse and remains to be demolished or rebuilt. The Chalk River library, the Lions Hall, and the Legion all play an important part in the community.

Local recreational activities include hiking, fourwheeling, and biking. In the winter, snowmobile and cross country ski trails can be enjoyed. A skating rink and baseball diamond are also present.

History

The town was first settled in the mid-19th century and named in 1875 after the Chalk River (named for the chalk loggers used to mark logs) flowing just south of the community.

Chalk River played an increasingly important role in settlement of the Upper Ottawa Valley after a Canadian Pacific Railway line was constructed through the area.

Demographics 

Local employers

Employers include Bubble Technology Industries. The Canadian Forest Service maintains the Petawawa Research Forest nearby.  The community borders the northern edge of CFB Petawawa.

Chalk River Laboratories, formerly Chalk River Nuclear Laboratories, was the first laboratory created by Atomic Energy of Canada Limited. It is located on the bank of the Ottawa River in the  neighbouring town of Deep River. It opened in 1944 and hosted the first nuclear reactor outside of the United States to become operational, in 1945. It was the site of two nuclear accidents in the 1950s, the 1952 NRX incident and the 1958 NRU incident. Future U.S. president Jimmy Carter, then a U.S. Navy officer in Schenectady, New York, led a team of 26 men, including 13 U.S. Navy volunteers in the hazardous cleanup of the first of these.

References

External links
The Former Residents of Buchanan Township
TransCanadaHighway.com profile

Former villages in Ontario
Designated places in Ontario
Communities in Renfrew County